Perry Chapman (born 3 May 1984), better known by his stage name Pez, is an Australian hip hop recording artist from Melbourne, Australia. He attended Kew High School in Melbourne's eastern suburbs. His debut album, A Mind of My Own peaked at No. 19 on the ARIA Urban albums chart.

Biography

Pez's debut album, A Mind of My Own, was produced by Matik,(DEKAH1) with contributions from members of TZU, The Cat Empire and Blue King Brown. It was released on 4 October 2008 by Soulmate Records (distributed by Inertia) and peaked at No. 19 on the ARIA Urban albums chart and No. 8 on the AIR albums chart. The single "The Festival Song" peaked at No. 14 on the ARIA Australian Singles charts and No. 1 on the AIR singles chart.

Pez appeared for the first time in a Triple J Hottest 100 with one entry in the 2008 countdown; "The Festival Song" (featuring 360) at number 7.

Pez has appeared onstage alongside US hip-hop stars Atmosphere, Mix Master Mike, Peanut Butter Wolf, Vanilla Ice, Lupe Fiasco, Brother Ali, Akrobatik, and Australian artists 360, Seth Sentry, Illy, TZU, Muph & Plutonic, Drapht, Bliss n Eso, Illzilla and many more.

On 11 May 2009, "These Days 2009", a reworked version of album track "These Days" featuring vocals by Hailey Cramer (Blue King Brown), aired on Triple J for the first time. A special edition of A Mind of My Own was released on 6 June 2009 with two new songs: "These Days 2009" and "Ain't Got Time" (Automatik Remix) featuring Dukes of Windsor and Seth Sentry; two videos: 'The Making of "These Days 2009"' and "The Festival Song" as well as new cover art.

At the AIR Awards of 2009, Pez won 'Best Independent Hip Hop/Urban Album' for A Mind of My Own.

In August 2011, Pez was featured on the Tom Ugly single 'I Was Somebody Else'. He was also featured on the Illy single 'Where Ya Been' released in July 2012.

Pez also featured on the song off the 2011 360 album Falling & Flying Just Got Started which was released as a single

Pez stated in a recent freestyle that he has been diagnosed with Graves' disease. Pez also stated on Facebook in late 2011 that he was working on a new album and mixtape and was hoping to have it/them released before Christmas, however this did not eventuate.

He announced on his Facebook page that he had established his own record label, "Easy Records". The first release on the label was the iTunes single "Perfect Couple, Pt. 2" by Fozzey & VanC.

On 4 December 2012, Pez's new single 'The Game' premiered on Triple J. It was later announced on a SoundCloud page where the single could be heard that it will be released by Soulmate Records on iTunes on 14 December 2012.
In 2014 he had more collaborations with 360, including hit single Live It Up, also opening a label called Forthwrite with 360. The pair has also announced a new upcoming album by forthwrite featuring both artists music.

Discography

Albums

Singles

Awards and nominations

AIR Awards
The Australian Independent Record Awards (commonly known informally as AIR Awards) is an annual awards night to recognise, promote and celebrate the success of Australia's Independent Music sector.

|-
| AIR Awards of 2009
|A Mind of My Own 
| Best Independent Hip Hop/Urban Album
| 
|-

APRA Awards
The APRA Awards are presented annually from 1982 by the Australasian Performing Right Association (APRA), "honouring composers and songwriters". They commenced in 1982.

! 
|-
| 2010 
| "The Festival Song" (Perry Chapman, Matthew Colwell, Hailey Cramer, Stephen Mowat)
| Urban Work of the Year
| 
| 
|-

ARIA Music Awards

|-
| 2009
| A Mind Of My Own
| Best Urban Release
| 
|-

Music Victoria Awards
The Music Victoria Awards are an annual awards night celebrating Victorian music. They commenced in 2006.

! 
|-
| Music Victoria Awards of 2017
| Don't Look Down
| Best Hip Hop Album
| 
| 
|-

References

1984 births
Living people
Australian hip hop musicians
Australian male rappers
Rappers from Melbourne